Full self-driving most commonly refers to:

 Self-driving car, a classification of autonomous technology relating to automotive vehicles
 Full Self-Driving, a driver assistance product offered by Tesla, Inc.